XHONC-FM is a radio station in Tuxtla Gutiérrez, Chiapas. Broadcasting on 92.3 FM, XHONC is owned by Grupo Radio Digital and carries a Regional Mexican format known as Radio Mexicana.

History
XEON-AM 710 came to air in 1946 and was among the first radio stations in southeastern Mexico.

XEON moved to FM in the early 2010s. Because the XHON-FM and XHEON-FM callsigns were taken, XEON became XHONC-FM with the added C for the state (Chiapas). This same change in callsign occurred with several other AM to FM migrants.

The station has maintained the same name (Radio Mexicana) and format throughout its history.

References

Radio stations in Chiapas